Corporal Franklin Carr (1844 to October 16, 1904) was an American soldier who fought in the American Civil War. Carr received the country's highest award for bravery during combat, the Medal of Honor, for his action during the Battle of Nashville in Tennessee on 16 December 1864. He was honored with the award on 24 February 1865.

Biography
Carr was born in Stark County, Ohio in 1844, the son of Elijah Carr and Ann Shull. He married Catherine "Kate" Trubey and had the following children Charles H Carr, William A Carr, Nettie E Carr and Eugene E Carr. He was enlisted in the 124th Ohio Infantry during the American Civil War. He died on 16 October 1904.

Medal of Honor citation

See also
List of American Civil War Medal of Honor recipients: A–F

Notes

References

External links
 Ohio in the Civil War: 124th Ohio Volunteer Infantry by Larry Stevens
 National flag of the 124th Ohio Infantry
Ohio Medal of Honor Recipients 

1844 births
1904 deaths
People of Ohio in the American Civil War
Union Army officers
United States Army Medal of Honor recipients
American Civil War recipients of the Medal of Honor